Radio City is the second album by the American rock group Big Star. Released in 1974, Radio City was recorded during 1973 at Memphis' Ardent Studios. Though not a commercial success at the time, it is now recognized as a milestone album in the history of power pop music. Critically acclaimed upon its release, the record sold poorly, partly due to a lack of promotion and the distribution problems of the band's struggling record label, Ardent Records. The album included "September Gurls" and "Back of a Car", which remain among the most famous Big Star songs; both the Searchers and the Bangles have covered "September Gurls".

The original Ardent Records LP featured record-jacket photographs by noted photographer William Eggleston, including The Red Ceiling on the cover. Eggleston was a close friend of band member Alex Chilton.

Some of the outtakes from the album include "I Got Kinda Lost", "Gone with the Light", "Motel Blues", and "There Was a Life" (an early version of "There Was a Light" from Chris Bell's I Am the Cosmos CD). The singles released from the album were "O My Soul" and "September Gurls".

Radio Citys reputation has grown since its release, with many critics and listeners of the opinion that it is not only the definitive power pop album but one of the finest rock-music albums. As writer Richard Meltzer told an interviewer, "Big Star...is the means through which most bands today who are influenced by the Beatles get their dose of the British Invasion."

It was voted number 319 in the third edition of Colin Larkin's All Time Top 1000 Albums (2000). In 2003 and 2012, the album was ranked number 405 on Rolling Stone magazine's list of the 500 greatest albums of all time, and at number 359 in the 2020 edition. Rolling Stone magazine also ranked the song "September Gurls" as number 178 on its 500 Greatest Songs of All Time. Sound & Vision ranked it number 43 on its Top 50 Albums of All Time list.

Composition and recording
In late 1972, following the release of the debut album, #1 Record, founding member Chris Bell left the group and the band became inactive for four months. Bell had already contributed to the music and lyrics of "O My Soul" and "Back of a Car"—songs which Alex Chilton recalls were written "by committee"— but receives no official credit. Chilton, aided by drummer Richard Rosebrough and at times by bassist Danny Jones, completed the recording of "Mod Lang", "She's a Mover", and "What's Going Ahn" without Jody Stephens or Andy Hummel. After performing at the Rock Writers Convention in 1973, the band returned to the studio to start work on Radio City.

Reception

On its release in February 1974, Radio City met with general acclaim. Record World judged the musicianship "superb"; Billboard described the album as "a highly commercial set", and Cashbox called it "a collection of excellent material". However, sales were thwarted by an inability to make the album available in stores. Stax Records, primary distributor for the band's Ardent Records label, had recently placed distribution of its catalog in the hands of the much larger Columbia Records; Radio City's release coincided with a disagreement between Stax and Columbia, which left Columbia refusing to distribute the catalog. As a result, the album achieved only minimal sales of around 20,000 copies at the time.

Giving an "A" rating, Robert Christgau calls the album "Brilliant, addictive", observing meanwhile that "The harmonies sound like the lead sheets are upside down and backwards, the guitar solos sound like screwball readymade pastiches, and the lyrics sound like love is strange," concluding his review with, "Can an album be catchy and twisted at the same time?" AllMusic's William Ruhlmann considers that the band's follow-up to #1 Record "lacked something of the pop sweetness (especially the harmonies)" of the debut but captured "Alex Chilton's urgency (sometimes desperation) on songs that made his case as a genuine rock & roll eccentric. If #1 Record had a certain pop perfection that brought everything together, Radio City was the sound of everything falling apart, which proved at least as compelling."

Track listing
Side one
"O My Soul" (Alex Chilton) – 5:40 [Mono; No stereo mix has ever been released]
"Life Is White" (Chilton, Andy Hummel) – 3:19
"Way Out West" (Hummel) – 2:50
"What's Going Ahn" (Chilton, Hummel) – 2:40
"You Get What You Deserve" (Chilton) – 3:08

Side two
"Mod Lang" (Chilton, Richard Rosebrough) – 2:45
"Back of a Car" (Chilton, Hummel) – 2:46
"Daisy Glaze" (Chilton, Hummel, Jody Stephens) – 3:49
"She's a Mover" (Chilton) – 3:12
"September Gurls" (Chilton) – 2:49
"Morpha Too" (Chilton) – 1:27
"I'm in Love with a Girl" (Chilton) – 1:48

Personnel
Big Star
Alex Chilton – guitar, vocals
Andy Hummel – bass guitar
Jody Stephens – drums, vocals

Additional musicians
Danny Jones – bass guitar ("Mod Lang", "She's a Mover", "What's Going Ahn")
Richard Rosebrough – drums ("Mod Lang", "She's a Mover", "What's Going Ahn")

Cover versions
 In 1981, the Searchers covered "September Gurls" on their album Love's Melodies, thus bringing full circle the influence that British Invasion bands had had on Big Star's sound.
 In 1986, The Bangles covered "September Gurls" on their album Different Light. 
 The Gin Blossoms released a cover of "Back of a Car" on the 2002 deluxe edition of their album New Miserable Experience.
 In 2011, Chris Carrabba of Dashboard Confessional covered "I'm in Love with a Girl" on his album Covered in the Flood.
 In 2015, Lucero included "I'm in Love with a Girl" on their LP All a Man Should Do. Jody Stephens sang back up vocals and the title also comes from the song. Lucero recorded the album at Ardent studios with Jody Stephens frequently "popping in".

Notes

References
 
 
 George-Warren, Holly. A Man Called Destruction: The Life and Music of Alex Chilton, from Box Tops to Big Star to Backdoor Man. New York: Viking, 2014. 152.

External links 
 Big Star - Radio City (1974) album review by William Ruhlmann, credits & releases at AllMusic
 Big Star - Radio City (1974) album releases & credits at Discogs.com
 Big Star - Radio City (1974) album to be listened as stream at Spotify.com

Big Star albums
Ardent Records albums
1974 albums